Mohamed Ali Diallo (born May 5, 1978) is a Burkinabé football player who has represented his national team.

He was part of the Burkinabé 2004 African Nations Cup team, who finished bottom of their group in the first round of competition, thus failing to secure qualification for the quarter-finals.

1998–2003    ASFA Yennega
2003–2004    Raja Casablanca
2004–2010   ASFA Yennega

External links 

1978 births
Burkinabé footballers
Burkinabé expatriate footballers
Living people
ASFA Yennenga players
Raja CA players
2004 African Cup of Nations players
Expatriate footballers in Morocco
Association football defenders
Burkina Faso international footballers
21st-century Burkinabé people